The Holy of Holies (Hebrew:  Qōḏeš haqQŏḏāšīm or Kodesh HaKodashim; also הַדְּבִיר haDəḇīr, 'the Sanctuary') is a term in the Hebrew Bible that refers to the inner sanctuary of the Tabernacle, where God's presence appeared. According to Hebrew tradition, the area was defined by four pillars that held up the veil of the covering, under which the Ark of the Covenant was held above the floor. According to the Hebrew scripture, the Ark contained the Ten Commandments, which were given by God to Moses on Mount Sinai. The Temple in Jerusalem was said to have been built by King Solomon for keeping the Ark.

Ancient Jewish traditions viewed the Holy of Holies as the spiritual junction of Heaven and Earth, the "axis mundi".

As a part of the Jewish Temple in Jerusalem, the Holy of Holies was situated somewhere on Temple Mount; its precise location in the Mount being a matter of dispute, with some classical Jewish sources identifying its location with the Foundation Stone, which sits under the Dome of the Rock. Other Jewish scholars argue that contemporary reports would place the Temple to the north or to the east of the current Dome of the Rock.

The Christian Crusaders associated the Holy of Holies with the Well of Souls, a small cave that lies underneath the Foundation Stone in the Dome of the Rock.

Hebrew terminology and translation

The construction "Holy of Holies" is a translation of the Hebrew  (Tiberian Hebrew: Qṓḏeš haQŏḏāšîm), which is intended to express a superlative. Examples of similar constructions are "servant of servants" (Gen 9:25), "Sabbath of sabbaths" (Ex 31:15), "God of gods" (Deut 10:17), "Vanity of vanities" (Eccl 1:2), "Song of songs" (Song of Songs 1:1), "king of kings" (Ezra 7:12), etc. The Bible distinguishes the proper noun "Holy of Holies" from the superlative adjective by the definite article, viz. Qṓḏeš HaQŏḏāšîm is the room and qṓḏeš qāḏāšîm is used otherwise. This adds an additional level of superlativity; the only matching examples of the prior set are "God of gods" and "Song of songs."

In the Authorized King James Version, "Holy of Holies" is always translated as "Most Holy Place". This is in keeping with the intention of the Hebrew idiom to express the utmost degree of holiness.  Thus, the name "Most Holy Place" was used to refer to the "Holy of Holies" in many English documents.

A related term is the debir transliterated in the Septuagint (the Greek translation as dabir, which either means the back (i.e. western) part of the Sanctuary, or derives from the verb stem D-B-R, "to speak", justifying the translation in the Latin Vulgate as oraculum, from which the traditional English translation "oracle" (KJV, 1611) derives.

Ancient Israel

Tabernacle

According to the Hebrew Bible, in order that God may dwell among the Israelites, God gave Moses instructions for erecting a sanctuary. The directions provide for:
 A wooden ark, gilded inside and outside, for the Tablets of the Covenant, with a pure gold cover as the "mercy seat" for the Divine Presence;
 A gilt table for the "Table of Showbread", on which loaves of bread were arranged;
 A golden menorah, lampstand of 7 oil lamps for a light never to be extinguished;
 The dwelling, including the curtains for the roof, the walls made of boards resting on silver feet and held together by wooden bolts, the multi-colored curtain veiling the Holy of Holies (of blue, purple, crimson, white and gold), the table and candlestick, and the outer curtain;
 A sacrificial altar made of bronzed boards for its korban/sacrifice;
 The outer court formed by pillars resting on bronze pedestals and connected by hooks and crossbars of silver, with embroidered curtains;
 Recipe and preparation of the oil for the Lampstand.

According to the Bible, the Holy of Holies was covered by a veil, and no one was allowed to enter except the High Priest, and even he would only enter once a year on Yom Kippur, to offer the blood of sacrifice and incense. The Bible reports that in the wilderness, on the day that the tabernacle was first raised up, the cloud of the Lord covered the tabernacle. There are other times that this was recorded, and instructions were given that the Lord would appear in the cloud upon the mercy seat (kapporet), and at that time the priests should not enter into the tabernacle (Leviticus 16:2). According to the Hebrew Bible, the Holy of Holies contained the Ark of the Covenant with representation of Cherubim.

Upon completion of the dedication of the Tabernacle, the Voice of God spoke to Moses "from between the Cherubim".

Solomon's Temple

 
The Holy of Holies was the inner sanctuary within the Tabernacle and Temple in Jerusalem when Solomon's Temple and the Second Temple were standing. A brocade curtain (Hebrew: parochet), made with cherubim motifs woven directly into the fabric from the loom, divided the Holy of Holies from the lesser Holy place. The Holy of Holies was located in the westernmost end of the Temple building, being a perfect cube: 20 cubits by 20 cubits by 20 cubits. The inside was in total darkness and contained the Ark of the Covenant, gilded inside and out, in which was placed the Tablets of the Covenant. According to both Jewish and Christian tradition, Aaron's rod and a pot of manna were also in the ark. The Ark was covered with a lid made of pure gold, known as the "mercy seat",() which was covered by the beaten gold cherubim wings, creating the space for the Divine Presence.

Second Temple

When the Temple was rebuilt after the Babylonian captivity, the Ark was no longer present in the Holy of Holies; instead, a portion of the floor was raised slightly to indicate the place where it had stood. In Jewish tradition, two curtains separated the Holy of Holies from the lesser Holy place during the period of the Second Temple. These curtains were woven with motifs directly from the loom, rather than embroidered, and each curtain had the thickness of a handbreadth (ca. 9 cm.). Josephus records that Pompey profaned the Temple by insisting on entering the Holy of Holies in 63 BCE. When Titus captured the city during the First Jewish–Roman War, Roman soldiers took down the curtain and used it to wrap therein golden vessels retrieved from the Temple.

Day of Atonement

The Holy of Holies was entered once a year by the High Priest on the Day of Atonement, to sprinkle the blood of sacrificial animals (a bull offered as atonement for the Priest and his household, and a goat offered as atonement for the people) and offer incense upon the Ark of the Covenant and the mercy seat that sat on top of the ark in the First Temple (the Second Temple had no ark and the blood was sprinkled where the Ark would have been and the incense was put on the Brazen Altar of incense). The animal was sacrificed and the blood was carried into the most holy place. The gold was also found in the Most Holy Place.

In ancient Judaism
The Magdala stone is thought to be a representation of the Holy of Holies carved before the destruction of the Temple in the year 70.

In Rabbinical Judaism
Traditional Judaism regards the location where the inner sanctuary was originally located, on the Temple Mount (Mount Moriah), as retaining some or all of its original sanctity for use in a future Third Temple. The exact location of the Holy of Holies is a subject of dispute.

Traditional Judaism regards the Holy of Holies as the place where the presence of God dwells. The Talmud gives detailed descriptions of Temple architecture and layout. According to the Babylonian Talmud Tractate Yoma, the Kodesh Hakodashim (Holy of Holies) is located in the center of the esplanade from a North-South perspective, but significantly to the West from an East–West perspective, with all the major courtyards and functional areas lying to its east.

The Talmud supplies additional details, and describes the ritual performed by the High Priest. During the ritual, the High Priest would pronounce the Tetragrammaton, the only point according to traditional Judaism that it was pronounced out loud. According to Jewish tradition, the people prostrated themselves fully on the ground when it was said. According to the Talmud, the High Priest's face upon exit from the Holy of Holies was radiant.

While under normal circumstances, access to the Holy of Holies was restricted to the High Priest and only on Yom Kippur, the Talmud suggests that repair crews were allowed inside as needed but were lowered from the upper portion of the room via enclosures so that they only saw the area they were to work on.

Synagogue architecture
Judaism regards the Torah ark, a place in a synagogue where the Torah scrolls are kept, as a miniature Holy of Holies.

Modern location 
The exact location of the Holy of Holies is a contentious issue, as elements of questioning the exact placement of the Temple are often associated with Temple denial. There are three main theories as to where exactly the Temple stood on the Mount: where the Dome of the Rock is now located; to the north of the Dome of the Rock (Professor Asher Kaufman); or to the east of the Dome of the Rock (Professor Joseph Patrich of the Hebrew University). 

The location of the Holy of Holies is, naturally, connected to the location of the Jewish Temple. The location of the Temple, however, had become uncertain already less than 150 years after the Second Temple's destruction, as detailed in the Talmud. Chapter 54 of the Tractate Berakhot states that the Holy of Holies was directly aligned with the Golden Gate, which would have placed the Holy of Holies slightly to the north of the Dome of the Rock, as Kaufman postulated. Chapter 54 of the Tractate Yoma and chapter 26 of the Tractate Sanhedrin, on the other hand, assert that the Holy of Holies stood directly on the Foundation Stone.

The Crusaders associated the Holy of Holies with the Well of Souls, which is located under the Foundation Stone of the Dome of the Rock. Most Orthodox Jews today completely avoid climbing up to Temple Mount, to prevent them from accidentally stepping on any holy areas. A few Orthodox Jewish authorities, following the opinion of the medieval scholar Maimonides, permit Jews to visit parts of the Temple Mount known not to be anywhere near any of the sanctified areas. Orthodox Jewish visitors to the Temple Mount, who come especially from those groups associated with the Temple Institute and its efforts to rebuild a Temple, seek to conform to the minimal requirements for coming near the Temple, such as immersing in a mikvah ("collection of water"; a ritual of purification), not coming during or following menstruation or immediately following a seminal emission, not showing their back towards its presumed location, etc.

To avoid religious conflict, Jewish visitors caught praying or bringing ritual objects are usually expelled from the area by police.

In apocryphal literature

According to the ancient apocryphal Lives of the Prophets, after the death of Zechariah ben Jehoiada, the priests of the Temple could no more, as before, see the apparitions of the angels of the Lord, nor could make divinations with the Ephod, nor give responses from the Debir.

Christianity

New Testament
The Greek New Testament retains the pre-Christian Septuagint phrase "Holy of the Holies" hágion (sg n) tōn hagíōn without the definite article as "Holies of Holies" hágia (pl n) hagíōn in Hebrews 9:3. In the Vulgate of Saint Jerome, these are rendered as sanctum sanctorum and sancta sanctorum, respectively. The Greek language was the common language upon Hellenization of much of the Middle East after the death of Alexander the Great, and the division of his empire among four generals. The Jews of the Diaspora spoke it; the Vulgate was a faithful translation for Christian Rome.

Christian traditions
Certain branches of Christianity, including the Eastern Orthodox Church, and the Ethiopian Orthodox Tewahedo Church continue to have a tradition of a Holy of Holies that they regard as a most sacred site. The ciborium, a permanent canopy over the altar in some churches, once surrounded by curtains at points in the liturgy, symbolizes the Holy of Holies. Some Christian churches, particularly the Catholic Church, consider the Church tabernacle, or its location (often at the rear of the sanctuary), as the symbolic equivalent of the Holy of Holies, due to the storage of consecrated hosts in that vessel.

Eastern Orthodox Church

The Greek phrase refers to the Tabernacle or Temple.

Ethiopian Orthodox Tewahedo Church
A cognate term in Ge'ez is found in the Ethiopian Orthodox Tewahedo Church: Qidduse Qiddusan, referring to the innermost sanctuary of an Orthodox Christian church, where the Tabot is kept and only clergy may enter. This is also called the "Bete Mekdes”. Every Ethiopian Orthodox church has one, and it is covered with a Curtain. There are often three entry points, symbolising the Holy Trinity. In the middle, there is always an altar where the church's Tabot is kept. There can be as many altars as the number of Tabots."

Malabar Nasrani tradition

The Saint Thomas Christians (also known as Nasrani or Syrian Christians) from Kerala, South India still follow much Jewish Christian tradition. In Nasrani tradition the Holy of Holies is kept veiled for much of the time. The red veil covers the inner altar or the main altar. It is unveiled only during the central part of the main Nasrani ritual. The main ritual of the Saint Thomas Christians is the Qurbana.

Roman Catholic Church

The Latin Vulgate Bible translates Qṓḏeš HaqQŏḏāšîm as Sanctum sanctorum (Ex 26:34). Reproducing in Latin the Hebrew construction, the expression is used as a superlative of the neuter adjective sanctum, to mean "a thing most holy". It is used by Roman Catholics to refer to holy objects beyond the Holy of Holies, and is specifically often used as an alternative name for a tabernacle, due to the object being a storage chamber for consecrated host and thus where the presence of God is most represented.

The Vulgate also refers to the Holy of Holies with the plural form Sancta sanctorum (2 Chr 5:7), arguably a synecdoche referring to the holy objects hosted there. This form is also used more broadly in Catholic tradition with reference to sanctuaries other than the Temple in Jerusalem. A notable example is for the Chiesa di San Lorenzo in Palatio ad Sancta Sanctorum, a chapel in the complex of St John Lateran in Rome.

The Church of Jesus Christ of Latter-day Saints

The Salt Lake Temple of the Church of Jesus Christ of Latter-day Saints (LDS Church) contains a Holy of Holies wherein the church's president—acting as the Presiding High Priest—enters to fulfill the relationship between the High Priest of Israel and God in accordance with the LDS Church's interpretation of the Book of Exodus and Latter-day Saint religious texts.

Seventh-Day Adventist Church 
Seventh-Day Adventism (SDA) believes that the Holy of Holies on Earth was a copy of the true tabernacle in heaven, and this view can also be seen in other Christian denominations. Because in Hebrews, God commands Moses to make sure that all things according to the pattern shewed to thee in the Mount Sinai (Heb 8:2,5). After the "Great Disappointment", preacher O. R. L. Crosier, Hiram Edson, and F. B. Hahn published new insights into Christ's sanctuary ministry that Jesus began to minister in the heavenly sanctuary after His ascension (Heb 9:24). Seventh-Day Adventism (SDA) believes that just as the high priest completed the special ministry on Yom Kippur and blessed the Israelites. Christ will come and bless his people after cleaning the Holy of Holies in heaven (Heb 9:23).

See also
 Honden, the most sacred building at a Shinto shrine
 Most Holy Place, in various religions
 Warren's Gate, an ancient entrance into the Temple platform in Jerusalem

References

Tabernacle and Temples in Jerusalem
Yom Kippur
Eastern Christian liturgy
Jewish sacrificial law
Hebrew Bible words and phrases
Superlatives in religion
Ark of the Covenant